Rebecca Lock is an English actress who has worked extensively in Musical Theatre, including many leading West End roles.

Early life
Lock was a member of the National Youth Music Theatre.., and attended Central School of Speech and Drama

Career
Lock left drama school at 19 to join the cast of Martin Guerre at the Prince Edward Theatre. After initially understudying the lead role of Bertrande de Rols, she subsequently alternated the part and sang the role on the original cast recording.  She was then in the Royal National Theatre's production of Oh, What a Lovely War! In 2000, she played Jellylorum in Cats at the New London Theatre. She then appeared in Mary Poppins at the Prince Edward Theatre, (while understudying the lead role of Mary Poppins, she played the part on many occasions, ending up alternating the role) . She was next seen in the West End when she worked alongside Daniel Boys in the cast of Avenue Q, at the Noel Coward Theatre, playing Kate Monster and Lucy the Slut. She took the role of Carlotta in The Phantom of the Opera at Her Majesty's Theatre in 2009. She next played Svetlana in Chess at the Princess of Wales Theatre, Toronto, directed by Craig Revel Horwood. Following this, she played the lead role of Mary in Merrily We Roll Along at Theatre Clwyd. She joined Gillian Lynne’s production of Dear World in 2013 at the Charing Cross Theatre, where she played opposite Betty Buckley. Later that year, she played Widow Corney in Oliver! at the Crucible Theatre, Sheffield, directed by Daniel Evans. In 2014, she played Rosie in Mamma Mia! at the Novello Theatre, then in 2015, she rejoined the cast of Sir Cameron Mackintosh's production of Mary Poppins in a major UK tour, playing the role of Winifred Banks. She stepped in at the last minute to play the role of Cheryl Gillan MP in Committee at the Donmar Warehouse in 2017.  In 2018, she played Ms. Fleming, alongside Carrie Hope Fletcher's Veronica Sawyer, in the UK premiere of Heathers at The Other Palace and the Theatre Royal Haymarket, directed by Andy Fickman. At the end of 2018, she played the lead role of Lilli Vanessi in Kiss Me Kate in a return to Sheffield's Crucible Theatre. In 2019, she joined Jason Manford and Ore Oduba in a UK tour of Kander and Ebb's Curtains playing the role of Carmen. In October 2019, she appeared in an episode of the BBC soap opera Doctors as Ursula van der Voort. She is currently playing in the School of Rock the Musical UK tour.

Personal life
Lock is married with a 18-year-old son, Jonah.

References

External links

English stage actresses
English musical theatre actresses
Living people
Alumni of the Royal Central School of Speech and Drama
Year of birth missing (living people)